Georg Fuchs von Rügheim (1519–1561) was the Prince-Bishop of Bamberg from 1556 to 1561.

Biography

Georg Fuchs von Rügheim was born in Rügheim, which is today a district of Hofheim, Bavaria, on February 6, 1519.  He matriculated at the University of Erfurt in 1535; at Heidelberg University in 1537; and at the University of Ingolstadt in 1539.

He was appointed coadjutor bishop of Bamberg on 25 August 1554, with Pope Julius III confirming the appointment on 26 May 1555.  He succeeded Weigand von Redwitz as Prince-Bishop of Bamberg on 22 May 1556.  He was ordained as a priest on 14 November 1557.  He was consecrated as a bishop by Petrus Rauh, auxiliary bishop of Bamberg, on 28 November 1557.

He died on 22 March 1561.  He is buried in Bamberg Cathedral, with a monument by Kilian Sorg.

References

1519 births
1561 deaths
Prince-Bishops of Bamberg